Mazzarelli is a surname of Italian origin. It may refer to:

 Angela Mazzarelli, New York judge
 Debra J. Mazzarelli (born 1955), New York politician
 Giuseppe Mazzarelli (born 1972), Swiss footballer
 Paolo Mazzarelli (born 1975), Italian actor

Italian-language surnames